Wendell J. Westcott (January 20, 1911 – April 30, 2010) was the University Carillonneur at Michigan State University from 1941 to 1987, and the creator and director of the Spartan Bell Ringers, a musical group composed of MSU students. Westcott was the author of Bells and Their Music, published in 1970. He served in the United States Army during World War II, stationed for much of that time in Egypt.

References
Wendell J. Westcott's biography from Michigan State University
Wendell J. Westcott's obituary

1911 births
2010 deaths
United States Army personnel of World War II
American male non-fiction writers
Carillonneurs
Michigan State University faculty
Musicians from Michigan